The Romance for violin and orchestra No. 2 in F major, Op. 50, is the second of two such compositions by Ludwig van Beethoven. It was written in 1798 but not published until 1805 (by which time Beethoven had completed and published the other work, Romance No. 1 in G major, Op. 40). The accompaniment is for flute and a pair each of oboes, bassoons and horns, with strings. The length is about eight minutes, Beethoven gives the tempo "Adagio Cantabile"

The opening bars for the solo violin

A ballet based on this work, titled Beethoven Romance, was premiered by New York City Ballet on 2 February 1989.

References

External links 
 

Compositions by Ludwig van Beethoven
Compositions for violin and orchestra
1798 compositions
Compositions in F major
Romance (music)